Bhamala Stupa is a ruined Buddhist stupa and National Heritage Site near Haripur, Pakistan that dates to the 2nd century CE. It is located on the bank of Haro River, a tributary of a Khanpur Dam, and is a tourist destination. Bhamala stupa is part of the larger Bhamala Buddhist Complex. The site is known for its 1,700 year old statue of the Buddha attaining enlightenment - considered the oldest such statue in the world.

Excavation
Sir Sufian Malik and Sir John Marshall first excavated the site in 1929, and work continued until the early 1930s. Excavations resumed in 2017. It is nominated at UNESCO World Heritage Sites. The nomination lead to the restoration of the ruins (mainly the Stupa). The site, as of June 2015, is under the control of Department of Archaeology and Museums, Government of Khyber Pakhtunkhwa, Government of Pakistan. The site is believed to be one of the best preserved sites in the Taxila Valley.

The stupa has a characteristic cruciform plan, with flights of stairs in the four cardinal directions, which is one of the last steps of the evolution of the Gandhara stupa, the preceding steps being:
1) the Dharmarajika Stupa with a near-Indian design of a semi-hemispheric stupa almost directly on the ground surface,
2) the Classic Loriyan Tangai Stupa, with an elongated shape and many narrative reliefs,
3) the near-pyramidal Jaulian stupa.

The cruciform design further evolved to the towering design of the second Kanishka stupa.

The Bhamala stupa is dated to the 2nd-5th century CE.

Specifications

According to the current understandings, the shape of main stupa is cruciform and it is the biggest surviving example of this shape in Taxila and Gandhara region.  The stupa is cross shaped and looks like an Aztec Pyramid. There are about nineteen but small votive stupas in courtyard surrounding the main stupa.

See also

List of UNESCO World Heritage Sites in Pakistan
List of museums in Pakistan

References

Haripur District
Archaeological sites in Khyber Pakhtunkhwa